United Nations Security Council Resolution 284, adopted on July 29, 1970, submitted the following question to the International Court of Justice for an advisory opinion: "What are the legal consequences for States of the continued presence of South Africa in Namibia notwithstanding Security Council resolution 276 (1970)?". The Council requested the Secretary-General to transmit the resolution, along with all documents likely to throw light upon to the question to the Court.

The resolution was adopted by 12 votes; the People's Republic of Poland, Soviet Union and the United Kingdom abstained.

See also
 History of Namibia
 List of United Nations Security Council Resolutions 201 to 300 (1965–1971)
 United Nations Commissioner for Namibia

References

External links 
 
Text of the Resolution at undocs.org

 0284
 0284
 0284
July 1970 events